The  High Commissioner of Sri Lanka to India is the Sri Lankan envoy to India. Countries belonging to the Commonwealth of Nations typically exchange High Commissioners, rather than Ambassadors. Though there are a few technical differences (for instance, whereas Ambassadors present their diplomatic credentials to the host country's head of state, High Commissioners are accredited to the head of government), they are in practice one and the same office.

Prior to the establishment of formal diplomatic ties with India after Ceylon gained independence in 1948, the Government of British Ceylon maintained an official representative to the British Raj in India from 1942 to 1948. The Sri Lankan High Commissioner to India is concurrently accredited as Ambassador to both Bhutan and Afghanistan. Sri Lanka also maintains two Consuls-Generals in Chennai and Mumbai.

Representatives of the Government of Ceylon

High Commissioners

See also
 List of heads of missions from Sri Lanka
 Deputy High Commission of Sri Lanka, Chennai

References
The High Commissioner of Sri Lanka to India

Lists of ambassadors to India
 
India